Louis de Fortia-Montréal (1618–1661) was a Roman Catholic prelate who served as Bishop of Carpentras (1657–1661) and Bishop of Cavaillon (1646–1656).

Biography
Louis de Fortia-Montréal was born in Avignon, France in 1618 and ordained a deacon on 9 June 1646.
On 10 September 1646, he was appointed during the papacy of Pope Innocent X as Bishop of Cavaillon.
On 23 September 1646, he was consecrated bishop by Pier Luigi Carafa, Cardinal-Priest of Santi Silvestro e Martino ai Monti, with Alphonse Sacrati, Bishop Emeritus of Comacchio, and Ranuccio Scotti Douglas, Bishop of Borgo San Donnino, serving as co-consecrators. 
On 26 June 1656, he was appointed during the papacy of Pope Alexander VII as Coadjutor Bishop of Carpentras and succeeded to the bishopric on 25 May 1657.
He served as Bishop of Carpentras until his death on 26 April 1661.

Episcopal succession
While bishop, he was the principal co-consecrator of:
Francesco de' Marini, Bishop of Albenga (1655); and
Juan de Paredes, Bishop of Castellammare di Stabia (1655).

References 

17th-century French Roman Catholic bishops
Bishops appointed by Pope Innocent X
Bishops appointed by Pope Alexander VII
1618 births
1661 deaths
Clergy from Avignon